The Torneo Nacional de Clubes 2015 (2015 Clubs National Tournament) was the 40th edition of the main clubs handball tournament organised by the Confederación Argentina de Handball, it was held between 09–13 September.

Groups Stage

Group A

Group B

Knockout stage

Championship bracket

5–8th place bracket

Final

Final standing

References

External links
CAH Official website
FEMEBAL Official website

2015 in handball